Torville Ashburn M. Jones (born 6 April 1984), better known by the stage name Tokio Myers, is an English musician and record producer best known for his work as a pianist. He won the reality show Britain's Got Talent in 2017, after which he released many of his independent compositions, including his debut album Our Generation.

Early life
Myers was born Torville Ashburn M. Jones in London on 6 April 1984. He is of West Indian descent. As an 11-year-old student at St George's Catholic School in Maida Vale, he witnessed the murder of the school's Irish headmaster Philip Lawrence at the hands of a local youth branch of the Wo Shing Wo gang, and was ushered to safety inside the building by his music teacher. He later studied with a full scholarship at the Royal College of Music.

Career
Myers has previously supported Kanye West, The Police, and Amy Winehouse when he toured with producer Mr Hudson's band Mr Hudson and the Library. Myers also supported Lianne La Havas on her 2016 European Tour.

He used synths and a sample pad as part of his performances, fusing classical roots with dance and pop genres. He was signed to a publishing deal with BMG.
 
In June 2017, Myers featured in and co-produced a charity single of "Bridge over Troubled Water" to raise money for those impacted by the Grenfell Tower fire, which happened in North Kensington on 14 June 2017.

On 13 October 2017, he released his official debut single, entitled "Bloodstream", which is his studio rendition of his audition performance at Britain's Got Talent. It was also announced as being the lead single from his debut album, entitled Our Generation, which being released in November 2017.

On 5 November 2017, Myers performed as a guest on The X Factor, performing "Angel", and he returned in the final, to duet with Kevin Davy White performing "Fastlove, Pt. 1" by George Michael.

On 4 February 2019, Myers competed in America's Got Talent: The Champions. The first time travelling to the US, his performance consisted of performing a medley of  Claude Debussy's "Clair de lune" and Ed Sheeran's "Bloodstream" on the piano and drums. He failed to make it to the final. He returned in the finale as a guest along with Voices of Hope Children's Choir, performing "All We Got" by Robin Schulz.

On 11 September 2019, Myers performed as a guest on America's Got Talent along with Stewart Copeland, performing "Safe and Sound". English singer Grace Davies performed the vocals.

Discography

Studio albums

Singles

As lead artist

As featured artist

Remixes

References

External links
Official website

1984 births
Living people
Britain's Got Talent winners
British classical pianists
British pop pianists
Black British musicians
British people of Barbadian descent
British multi-instrumentalists
Musicians from London
Alumni of the Royal College of Music
21st-century pianists